Abarema leucophylla var. vaupesensis is a vulnerable variety of legume. It is restricted to an area along the Vaupés River and Apaporís River in Vaupés Department, Colombia.

References

leucophylla var. vaupesensis
Endemic flora of Colombia